Jane Prentice (née Righetti; born 22 June 1953) is a former Australian politician who served as a member of the House of Representatives from 2010 to 2019, representing the Division of Ryan in Queensland. She previously served on the Brisbane City Council from 2000 to 2010. She is a member of the Liberal National Party of Queensland and sat with the Liberal Party in federal parliament.

Early career
Prentice is the great-granddaughter of Sir George Pearce, a former long-serving minister and senator for Western Australia from the Labor, Nationalist and United Australia parties. Prior to entering politics, she had 25 years involvement with the tourism sector, principally the event and convention industry. She was a councillor on the Liberal-controlled Brisbane City Council from 2000 to 2010, representing Walter Taylor Ward.

Member of Parliament
At the 2010 federal election, Prentice comfortably defeated sitting local member, Michael Johnson, who was expelled from the Liberal Party in May 2010 for allegedly bringing the party into disrepute, having used his political position and entitlements to further his business interests and those of a company set up almost exclusively to fund his prolific overseas travel.

On 26 February 2014, Prentice tabled in the house a petition organised by the Pharmacy Guild of Australia in response to proposed changes to Pharmaceutical Benefits Scheme and the impact on community pharmacies. This petition, signed by 1,210,471 people, is the largest petition ever received by the Australian parliament. Prentice also delivered the first speech in the House of Representatives to include Auslan.

Prentice was appointed Assistant Minister for Disability Services in February 2016, as a member of the First Turnbull Ministry. Following a reshuffle after the July 2016 federal election, her title was changed to Assistant Minister for Social Services and Disability Services. She did not retain her position when Turnbull was replaced as prime minister by Scott Morrison in August 2018.

In May 2018, she was defeated for LNP preselection to recontest her seat at the 2019 Australian federal election by Julian Simmonds, a member of the Brisbane City Council.

References

External links
 Hon Jane Prentice MP - Parliament of Australia web site
 Jane Prentice – Jane Prentice web site 

1953 births
Living people
Liberal National Party of Queensland members of the Parliament of Australia
Members of the Australian House of Representatives for Ryan
Members of the Australian House of Representatives
Turnbull Government
Women members of the Australian House of Representatives
21st-century Australian politicians
21st-century Australian women politicians
Government ministers of Australia